Reem Bassiouney (   ; March 6, 1973) is an Egyptian author, professor of sociolinguistics and Chair Department of Applied Linguistics at The American University in Cairo. In Addition, Bassiouney is  the editor of the Routledge Series of Language and Identity. She is also the editor and creator of the journal Arabic Sociolinguistics Edinburgh. She has written several novels and a number of short stories and won the 2009 Sawiris Foundation Literary Prize for Young Writers for her novel Dr. Hanaa. While a substantial amount of her fiction has yet to be translated into English, her novel The Pistachio Seller was published by Syracuse University Press in 2009, and won the 2009 King Fahd Center for Middle East and Islamic Studies Translation of Arabic Literature Award. Bassiouney also won Naguib Mahfouz Award from Egypt's Supreme Council for Culture in the best Egyptian novel category for her best selling novel, The Mamluk Trilogy. She was also the winner of the National Prize for Excellence in Literature of the year 2022 from the Egyptian Ministry of Culture.

Education and career
Reem Bassiouney was born in Alexandria in 1973. She attended El Nasr Girls' College, and studied English literature at Alexandria University. After graduating, she was appointed at the University, but decided to pursue her studies abroad. She was accepted for a graduate degree in linguistics at the University of Oxford, where she became a member of Somerville College. She obtained her doctorate from the University of Oxford, and worked briefly in the UK, before moving to the United States, where she was appointed professor of linguistics at the University of Utah. From there she moved to Georgetown University and then returned to her native Egypt when she joined the faculty of The American University in Cairo in 2013.

She has written several fictional works and multiple books on Arabic linguistics/sociolinguistics.

Bibliography

Fiction 
 The Smell of the Sea, 2005. رائحة البحر.
 The Pistachio Seller, 2007. بائع الفستق. English translation, 2009.  Winner of the 2009 King Fahd Center for Middle East and Islamic Studies Translation of Arabic Literature Award.
 Dr. Hanaa, 2008. دكتورة هناء. Winner of the 2009 Sawiris Foundation Literary Prize for Young Writers. English translation, 2011. Spanish and Greek translation.
Love, Arab style, 2009. الحب على الطريقة العربية.
Mortal Designs, 2010. أشياء رائعة.
The Tour Guide, 2010. مرشد سياحي.
The Mamluk Trilogy, 2018. اولاد الناس: ثلاثية المماليك. Best seller and winner of the 2019- 2020 Naguib Mahfouz Award in the best Egyptian novel category from Egypt's Supreme.  Council for Culture. English Translation, 2022  
Fountain of the Drowning: The Path of Land and Sea, 2020. سبيل الغارق الطريق والبحر. English Translation. (translated by Roger Allen as Al-Qata'i Ibn Tulun's City Without Walls )
Ibn Tulun Trilogy, 2021 القطائع ثلاثية ابن طولون 
The Fatimid Trilogy, 2022 الحلواني ثلاثية الفاطميين

Academic Books 
Functions of Code-Switching in Egypt, 2006.
Arabic Sociolinguistics, 2009.
Arabic and the Media: Linguistic Analyses and Applications, 2010. Edited volume.
Arabic Language and Linguistics, 2012. Edited volume.
Language and Identity in Modern Egypt, 2014.

References

External links
public profile on university website
public profile on Academia.edu

Living people
Georgetown University people
Egyptian novelists
Egyptian expatriates in the United States
1973 births
Alumni of Somerville College, Oxford
University of Utah faculty